John Byng, 5th Viscount Torrington (18 February 1743 – 8 January 1813), styled for most of his lifetime The Hon. John Byng (before 1812), was a notable English diarist. His fifteen extant diaries, covering the years 1781–1794, describe his travels on horseback throughout England and Wales during twelve summers. He was a great-uncle of the politician Lord John Russell.

Origins
He was the younger son of George Byng, 3rd Viscount Torrington, of Southill Park in Bedfordshire.

Career
On 14 December 1812 he succeeded in the viscountcy his elder brother, George Byng, 4th Viscount Torrington, but died before he had the opportunity of being introduced into the House of Lords. The paternal seat of Southill Park had been sold by his elder brother for the repayment of debt, and John Byng thus found himself a viscount without an estate.

Marriage and progeny
On 3 March 1767 he married Bridget Forrest, a daughter of Commodore Arthur Forrest (d. 1770), of the Royal Navy by his wife Juliana Frederica Marina Cecila Lynch (1722–1804). By his wife he had 14 children, 13 of whom survived infancy:

Sons
 George Byng, 6th Viscount Torrington (5 January 1768 – 18 June 1831), eldest son and heir, who took his seat in the House of Lords on 3 February 1813. He married twice, firstly on 8 February 1793 to Elizabeth Langmead (d. 1810) and secondly on 5 October 1811 to Frances Harriet Barlow (d. 1868). 
 Edmund John Byng (11 September 1774 – 5 April 1854), 2nd son.
 John Byng (16 January 1777 – 23 November 1811), who married Eliza Amelia Mayne on 5 November 1806.
 Henry Dilkes Byng (22 September 1781 – 24 September 1860), who married Maria Jane Clarke (d. 1874) on 2 October 1810.
 Frederick Gerald Finch Byng (4 December 1784 – 5 June 1871), known as Poodle Byng. A Regency society dandy who served as a Page of Honour to George, Prince of Wales, held commissions in the Army, and worked in the Foreign Office. In his later life he became actively involved in the campaign to improve sanitation in London.
 A stillborn child, sex not recorded, born in 1794.

Daughters
 Elizabeth Lucy Byng (11 July 1769 – 18 January 1846), who married twice, firstly on 26 September 1797 to Rear-Admiral Percy Fraser (1767–1827), Royal Navy, and secondly on 10 August 1836 to George Goodenough Lynn (1809–1889).
 Cecilia Elizabeth Byng (15 August 1770 – July 1843), who married Robert Gregge-Hopwood (1773–1854) on 31 October 1805. They lived at Hopwood Hall, Middleton, Lancashire; they were friends of the poet Lord Byron and his work Childe Harold's Pilgrimage was partly written while he stayed with them in 1811.
 Anna Maria Bridget Byng (18 August 1771 – 30 October 1852), who on 29 August 1794 married Rev. Charles Henry Hall (1763–1827), an ecclesiastic who served in several prominent positions in the Church of England.
 Frances Byng (11 May 1773 – November 1796).
 Bridget Augusta Forrest Byng (1779 – 4 March 1876), who in July 1806 married Captain the Hon. Charles Herbert (1774–1808), Royal Navy.
 Georgiana Byng (1786 – 23 July 1856), who married Rev. Geoffrey Hornby (1780–1850).
 Beatrice Charlotte Byng (15 January 1788 – 12 March 1848), who married Rev. Colin Alexander Campbell (1792–1860) on 30 November 1820.
 Lucy Juliana Byng (about 1790 – 27 November 1881), who on 5 October 1809 married Sir John Morris, Baronet (1775–1855).

Death and burial
He was buried in the Byng Mausoleum in the Church of All Saints in the parish of Southill in Bedfordshire.

The diaries
Tour to the West, [31 May – 14 July] 1781, Bodleian Library, Oxford (Travel Journals).
 A Ride into the West, [23 August – 9 September] 1782, Hampshire Archives & Local Studies, Winchester (Diary of a Tour through Surrey, Hampshire and Dorset).
A Tour to North Wales, [25 June – 31 July] 1784, Cardiff Central Library.
A Ride taken in July, [2 – 12 July] 1785, Shakespeare Centre Library & Archive, Stratford-upon-Avon (Diary of a Tour through Oxfordshire and Warwickshire).
Of a Tour into South Wales, [21 July – 18 August] 1787, Cardiff Central Library.
Fragment of a diary of a Tour in Hertfordshire, (circa 11-circa 21) June 1788, Cambridge University Library (Torrington Diary, June 1788).
A Tour into Sussex, [15 – 25 August] 1788, Brighton & Hove Library Service (Diary of a Tour through Sussex).
A Tour in the Midlands, [9 June – 4 July] 1789, Bodleian Library, Oxford (Travel Journals).
Tour in the Midlands, [7 – 22 June 29 June – 20 July] 1790, Manchester Archives & Local Studies (Diary of Tours from Leicester to Manchester & through the East Midlands).
A Tour into Bedfordshire, [21 August – 5 September] 1790, Luton Central Library.
 A Tour into Kent, [17 – 26 September] 1790, in private hands.
A Tour into Lincolnshire, [13 June – 27 July] 1791, Lincoln Central Library (Diary of a Tour of Lincolnshire).
A Tour to the North, [27 May – 17 July] 1792, Bodleian Library, Oxford (Travel Journals).
Tour into North Wales, [9 July – 20 August] 1793, Cardiff Central Library.
A Tour in Bedfordshire, [1 May – 13 June 6 – 28 September] 1794, Luton Central Library.

The historian Donald Adamson believes there to be a missing diary of Byng's tour of Devon.

Scope of his work
Byng's journeys encompass England and Wales in the summer months of 1781–1794. After this time he gave up his journeyings, feeling he was too old to cover so many miles on horseback with only a servant to accompany him and sometimes to ride on ahead to book the inn for the next night's stay. This servant, who was the person variously of Thomas Bush, Garwood, young Thomas Bush or an unlikeable unnamed valet, had the duties of carrying his master's bedclothes on his own horse, making his master's bed, attending to both horses, calling his master in the morning and "give him consequence". Viewed in a literary light, Bush or Garwood resembles Don Quixote's Sancho Panza.

Byng wrote no travel journal for Scotland though he may have been acquainted with that country. He travelled the Midlands in 1774 without leaving any record of his impressions.

On his travels Byng displays the training and attitude of a retired Army officer (subsequently, from 1782 to 1799, a Commissioner of Stamps) together with the intellectual outlook of an antiquary steeped from his schooldays in Shakespeare and in the classics of Greek and Roman antiquity. He delights in ruins, such as those of Tintern Abbey, Crowland Abbey and Fountains Abbey, studies gravestones in many or most of the churches he visits, and records the inscriptions on some of them. He makes detours to view historic mansions whilst taking care not to stay at any of them even when they are inhabited by his aristocratic relations. He does not, for example, enter Woburn Abbey although it is the home of his niece's brother-in-law, the future 6th Duke of Bedford. Nor does he stay with his brother the 4th Viscount Torrington but rather at the Sun Inn at Biggleswade, which he calls his "country seat".

In keeping with his military training Byng is gifted with his pencil. Like Turner in the Lake District, he uses his paintbrushes to sketch charming but somewhat naïve watercolour scenes, for example of Barfreston church, Greta Bridge or the "tortur'd tree" at Bell Bar.

Like Horace Walpole or William Thomas Beckford, he admired Gothic architecture, thus foreshadowing the Romantic movement. (It is the attitude satirised by Jane Austen in Northanger Abbey). He deplores any "ugly, staring, red-brick house", such as Dunham Massey, Adlington Hall, Etruria Hall or Attingham Park. And yet, as befits a former Army officer, he admires orderliness and the well-kept economy of a flourishing country estate.

There is a vividness and an immediacy about Byng's documentary record which is seldom if ever to be found in the work of any other British diarist.

Byng's picture of 18th-century society

Byng is a laudator temporis acti, or "praiser of times past". As a Whig he looked favourably on the Hanoverian settlement and expressed a strong dislike for Scotland. He lamented that Scotland seemed to be taking over England: “like their native thistles, they never can be weeded out”. He was a countryman at heart, far happier fishing and shooting than endeavouring to adapt himself to the airs and graces of polite London society, for which he had little affection. He fondly recollects his visits to Yotes Court, Maidstone in about 1755. Yet emotionally he was rooted in Bedfordshire, the county of his childhood.

Faithful to the established Church of England (although conscious of its imperfections), he had only limited sympathy with Methodism – whilst recognising its potential to rejuvenate traditional churchgoing.

He was aware that great social changes were afoot and did not totally disapprove of them. Concerning the new industries, he was full of admiration for Cromford Mill in Derbyshire, and for the pioneering technology of Richard Arkwright. He admired the silk-mills at Overton near Basingstoke, the mining and the navigation tunnel at Sapperton in Gloucestershire, and Josiah Wedgwood's potteries at Etruria, Staffordshire. But this was the picturesque side. Of the Derbyshire mills he writes: “These cotton mills, seven storeys high and fill'd with inhabitants, remind me of a first-rate man of war and, when they are lighted up on a dark night, look most luminously beautiful". Politically, however, he dreaded revolution or even reform.

In the course of his journeyings Byng provides much information about the inns and alehouses of the time. Often included in his diaries are the bills he has paid at his various stopping-places. Partly because they were so often on his routes, there were four inns he especially liked: the Sun at Biggleswade, the Haycock at Wansford, the Ram's Head at Disley, and the Wheatsheaf at Alconbury (Hill). People travelled with their own bed-sheets, merely renting a bed at an inn in preference to sleeping in "damp house sheets". At Leicester the diarist's bed was "sheeted, contrary to [his] orders". A rushlight would faintly illuminate his bedroom during the hours of darkness.

Byng rose early in the morning and sometimes breakfasted as late as nine. Broadly speaking, dinner (lunch) was at two o’clock. However, it could be called for as late as four. Supper could be at any time between seven and nine o'clock. At both meals there was sometimes a fairly wide range of dishes. The breakfast drink was usually coffee. The food was standard fare, with recipes that were fairly identical in whichever part of the country Byng happened to be. Breakfast costed 10 pence, dinner was 1 shilling 6 pence or 2 shillings, and supper 1 shilling: at Boston, Lincolnshire it is called a "gentleman's supper", at 1/9d. Wine, the cost varying with the quantity consumed, was an additional charge. Also additional were the horses' hay and corn, which generally cost 3/6d to 4/-.

The quality of inn fare varied enormously. At Bedford Byng lifted the lid of a damson tart and decided not to have any of it – plastering it down "for the next comer", and adding caustically that "it was not the first time of the lids being removed". A good "pigeon-pie, with a pint of good port wine" was one of his favourite collations. James Burnett, Lord Monboddo had for "supper ... a provincial dish, cook'd from his directions".

At the Sun Inn at Biggleswade Byng had not only his own parlour, where he could eat privately, but was also provided with his own lockable chest of drawers (complete with "nightcap, shirts, fishing-tackle") and with grazing for his horse whilst he was in London. Though at Broadway, Worcestershire he enjoyed the luxury of a "spacious and clean parlour", he was often in the "public parlours"; and this was all the more remarkable because of the great disparity which then existed between the grand bedrooms and dining-rooms of historic houses and the cold, draughty, ill-lit "gallery chamber[s]" where he so frequently had to spend the night. In the era of inns and alehouses, hotels had scarcely come into existence (though there was one at Buxton and in Manchester there was the Bridgewater Arms Hotel. The bedrooms in these inns and alehouses could be very primitive indeed. There might be "dirty blankets" (25 August 1782). At Settle his "windows, door and chimney board kept an incessant clatter". A traveller, or tourist, might even be made to share a servants' bedroom. At Lewes Byng and Isaac Dalby had to share a double bed. On the more positive side, it was sometimes possible to have supper served in one's bedroom.

On his travels Byng met up with, or glimpsed, many of the prominent people of his age. In August 1788 he undertook a tour into Sussex with the mathematician Isaac Dalby. At Biggleswade, in 1792, he met Humphry Repton. At Birmingham, in the same year, he encountered Sarah Siddons. Two years later, at Ampthill, he glimpsed Lord Monboddo travelling post-haste from London to Edinburgh. Byng leaves unforgettable memories of Blenheim Palace (its grounds, gardens and gardeners but not of the Duke of Marlborough himself). His meeting with Colonel Johnson, told with economy, lingers in the imagination.

The overall impression is that of a man keenly aware of social change: that is Byng's head; but in his heart he clings to the old ways.

Purpose of his work

In England and Wales Byng set out, year after year, on his own sort of Grand Tour. The Grand Tour, a leisurely exploration of outstanding cultural features of the European Continent, was undertaken by many young men—though not by Byng himself—before and during the 1780s. Byng, intensely patriotic, believed that there was just as much of interest in Britain as in France or Italy, particularly as England and Wales contained so much that was picturesque.

He writes in his Fragment of a diary of a Tour in Hertfordshire, June 1788:-

Now I should be glad to ask of our Travellers, who brag of every country but their own, where they will find a cheaper charge than this [18/3d for 2½ days]; which was on a high road, [at South Mimms,] near the metropolis of Europe!

Talk not, therefore, gentlemen, of foreign parts, till you have seen and learnt something of your own country: – ye, who drive by Canterbury Cathedral, without deigning a look, and return boasting of rialtos, eclipsed by the work of the most ordinary Welsh masons.

“If my journals should remain legible, or be perused at the end of 200 years", he writes elsewhere, "there will, even then, be little curious in them relative to travel, or the people; because our island is now so explored; our roads, in general, are so fine; and our speed has reach'd the summit".

But it is impossible to agree with his assessment that The Torrington Diaries or Rides Round Britain have no enduring historical value. Like Samuel Pepys, Byng conveys a most vivid impression of what it was like for the diarist to live from day to day in the society of his own period.

Arms

See also
 Earl of Strafford

References

Further reading
John Byng, 5th Viscount Torrington, The Torrington Diaries, ed. C.B. Andrews, 4 vols, 1934–1938.
John Byng, 5th Viscount Torrington, The Torrington Diaries, ed. C.B. & Fanny Andrews, 1954.
John Byng, 5th Viscount Torrington, The Torrington Diaries. A Literary Account of English Life and Thought in the 18th Century, ed. Bothaina Abd-El-Hamid Mohamed, 1958.
John Byng, 5th Viscount Torrington, Byng's Tours: The Journals of the Hon. John Byng, 1781–1792, ed. David Souden, 1991.
John Byng, 5th Viscount Torrington, Rides Round Britain, ed. Donald Adamson, 1996.
"Following John Byng", Folio, Donald Adamson, summer 1996, pp. 3–9.

External links
 www.nationalarchives.gov.uk
 www.burkespeerage.com
 Current research being undertaken on Byng and the Torrington Diaries
 Full text of Volume 4 of the Torrington Diaries on The Internet Archive, as page images.
 Full text of Volume 4 of the Torrington Diaries on A Vision of Britain through Time, as proofread text with links to the places named.

1743 births
1813 deaths
18th-century English writers
18th-century English male writers
People from Southill, Bedfordshire
People educated at Westminster School, London
Viscounts in the Peerage of Great Britain
Grenadier Guards officers
British travel writers
John